Abdulla Al Salem (born 19 December 1992) is a professional footballer plays for Al-Ettifaq .

References

External links  
 

1992 births
Living people
Khaleej FC players
Ettifaq FC players
Al-Fayha FC players
Al Nassr FC players
Saudi Arabian footballers
People from Qatif
Saudi First Division League players
Saudi Professional League players
Association football forwards
Saudi Arabian Shia Muslims